In the Tcherny railway accident near Tcherny, Russia on 13 July 1882, a train was derailed and more than 40 people killed.
This rail accident was one of the 20 most serious accidents (by death toll) before 1953.

See also
List of rail accidents (1880–1899)
List of Russian rail accidents

References

Derailments in Russia
Railway accidents in 1882
1882 in the Russian Empire
July 1882 events
Disasters in the Russian Empire
1882 disasters in the Russian Empire